The Sanjak of Biga was a second-level Ottoman province (sanjak or liva), roughly corresponding to the modern Çanakkale Province of Turkey.

History
The area of the sanjak was conquered from the Byzantine Empire by 1363, and with the establishment of the Anatolia Eyalet became part of it. In 1533 it was transferred to the newly created Eyalet of the Archipelago. In 1841, it was transferred to the Hüdavendigâr Eyalet, where it remained until 1867, when it became the capital (pasha-sanjak) of the Vilayet of the Archipelago (formed from the former eyalet of the same name). The governor's seat was not at Biga, however, but at Kale-i Sultaniye.

In 1877, the sanjak was moved to the Istanbul Vilayet, before becoming part of the short-lived Karasi Vilayet (1881–88). After the latter's dissolution, Biga became an independent sanjak, roughly equivalent to the modern Çanakkale Province, except for the Gallipoli peninsula, which was a separate sanjak. In the last decades of the Ottoman Empire, it was often called after its capital as Kale-i Sultaniye (modern Çanakkale).

References

Sources
 

Biga
History of Çanakkale Province
States and territories established in the 14th century